Antonio Cavallucci (21 August 1752 – 18 November 1795) was an eighteenth-century Italian painter of religious scenes and portraits.

Biography

Cavallucci was born in Sermoneta in the Lazio. His artistic talents were recognized in an early stage by Francesco Caetani, Duke of Sermoneta in 1738-1810. In 1765, he brought the 13-year-old Cavallucci to Rome, where he became a pupil of Stefano Pozzi and three years later of Gaetano Lapis. He also studied drawing at the Accademia di San Luca (c. 1769-1771).

His earliest work dates from the mid-1760s. It is a tempera frieze in the Casa Cavallucci in Sermoneta. His first portrait was of his benefactor Duke Francesco Caetani. This portrait is only preserved as an engraving in 1772 by Pietro Leone Bombelli (1737–1809).

His first major commission was the decoration of five audience chambers in the Caetani Palace in Rome in 1776. He painted mythological scenes and allegories appropriate for each room.

In the early 1780s, he painted mostly portraits, such as those of Francesco Caetani and Teresa Corsini, Duchess of Sermoneta.

His painting, The Origin of Music (1786), was based on illustrations in the book Iconologia (1593) from Cesare Ripa.

Cavalluccialso received commissions from Cardinal Romualdo Braschi-Onesti (1753–1817), nephew of the pope Pius VI. He painted the portraits of his new benefactor and of the pope in 1788.

He was inducted into the Accademia di San Luca in 1786, Academy of Arcadia in 1788, and the Congregazione dei Virtuosi al Pantheon in 1788.

Cavallucci is said to have painted St Benedict Joseph Labre while the saint was in ecstasy, or (as is perhaps more plausible), having seen the saint in ecstasy, to have brought him to his studio and painted his portrait there. In later years, he worked for Cardinal Francesco Saverio Zelada, decorating his titular church San Martino ai Monti in Rome. Cavallucci died in Rome in 1795.

He was influenced by Pompeo Batoni and Anton Raphael Mengs. There is in his art some of the northern European feeling that had made its way into Rome at the end of the eighteenth century. The Portuguese painter Domingos Sequeira was one of his pupils. It is also known that in Rome he had two more pupils: Giovanni Micocca and Tommaso Sciacca.

Selected works
 Abigail before David (1773)
 Departure of Hector and Andromache (1773)
 Crucifixion with Saints (1773)
 Presentation of the Virgin (1786) in the Cathedral of Spoleto
 Thomas of Cori (levitation) (1786), Eucharistic museum of Hieron, Paray-le-Monial, France
 Venus with Ascanius, at the Palazzo Cesarini in Rome
 Investiture of St Bona (1791), Cathedral of Pisa
 Principe del Belvedere (1793), Gallerie di Capodimonte, Naples
 St. Elias and the Purgatory (1793) S. Martino ai Monti, Rome
 Altar piece in the Church of San Nicolò in Catania, Sicily
 St Francis announces the Pardon to the people in the Chapel of St Diego d’Alcalà in the Basilica of Santa Maria degli Angeli in Assisi.

References
 

1752 births
1795 deaths
People from Sermoneta
18th-century Italian painters
Italian male painters
Italian Baroque painters
Italian neoclassical painters
18th-century Italian male artists